María Susana Muhamad González is a Colombian political scientist, environmentalist and politician belonging to the Colombia Humana party. Since August 7, 2022, she has held the position of Minister of Environment and Sustainable Development of her country, in the government of Gustavo Petro.

Muhamad was secretary of the environment and general secretary of the Mayor's Office of Bogotá. In 2019 she was elected city councilor, a position she held until the first semester of 2022.

Muhamad has a degree in political science from the Universidad de los Andes, and a Master's in Management and Planning of Sustainable Development from the University of Stellenbosch in South Africa. She was a sustainable development consultant for Shell Global Solutions International in The Hague, the Netherlands.

In 2021, Muhamad was elected as vice president of the national coordination board of the Colombia Humana party, after this political movement officially received its legal status.

Muhamad is a nationally and internationally recognized environmentalist and her work focuses on developing actions that allow Colombia to consolidate as a world power of life, through compliance with international agreements on climate change and loss of biodiversity, the protection of environmental defenders, and the fight against deforestation in the Amazon region.

Minister of Environment and Sustainable Development
On July 5, during the transition from the Duque government to the Petro government, the elected President Gustavo Petro announced the appointment of Muhamad as Minister of Environment and Sustainable Development

Muhamad stressed that the environmental sector has been marginalized in past administrations, in addition to its purpose to work hand in hand with communities for the preservation of the environment, as Colombia is the second most biodiverse country in the world., she has shown herself as a defender of the escazu agreements, within her agenda as environment minister in conjunction with the president and the congress of congress for the legislation and subsequent implementation of the agreements.

Muhamad has been clear regarding her positions on three of the most important issues on her agenda as environment minister. One of them, which has also been one of the most questioned by the opposition, is fracking. The government seeks to eliminate fracking as a means of extracting oil, since this means of extraction creates irreparable damage to the environment as well as to the atmosphere and water reserves.

Notes

References

External links 

|-

|-

|-

|-

1986 births
Living people
Politicians from Bogotá
Cabinet of Gustavo Petro
Government ministers of Colombia
Women government ministers of Colombia
Humane Colombia politicians
21st-century Colombian politicians
21st-century Colombian women politicians
Colombian political scientists
Women political scientists
University of Los Andes (Colombia) alumni
Stellenbosch University alumni